The Cordell Hull State Office Building is a historic building in Nashville, Tennessee.

Location
The building is located on the grounds of the Tennessee State Capitol, at 425 5th Avenue North in Nashville, Tennessee.

History
The building was constructed from 1952 to 1954. It is 36.58 metre high and 348,606 square feet, with ten storeys. It was designed in the Art Deco architectural style. It was named in honor of Cordell Hull (1871–1955), a Tennessean who served as the 47th United States Secretary of State from 1933 to 1944, under President Franklin D. Roosevelt.

In 2013, Jones Lang LaSalle suggested it should be demolished, although the plan was questioned by journalists and preservationists. After a petition from preservationists and a study by Centric Architecture suggesting it would cost more to demolish it and build a new building instead of refurbishing it, it was stalled.

It was announced in 2015 that the Cordell Hull Building would be renovated, and the Legislature would move its scattered offices from the Legislative Plaza, War Memorial Building and Rachel Jackson Building. A new tunnel to connect Cordell Hull to the Capitol was under construction in 2016. Projected completion for the entire project is Fall 2017.

References

Buildings and structures in Nashville, Tennessee
Art Deco architecture in Tennessee
Office buildings completed in 1954